Oxyna lutulenta is a species of fruit fly in the family Tephritidae.

Distribution
Russia, Kazakhstan, Mongolia.

References

Tephritinae
Insects described in 1869
Diptera of Europe
Diptera of Asia